Santiago Tetepec is a town and municipality in Oaxaca in south-western Mexico. It is located in the Jamiltepec District in the west of the Costa Region.

References

Municipalities of Oaxaca